The scalp is the anatomical area bordered by the face anteriorly and the neck to the sides and posteriorly.

Scalp or  SCALP may also refer to:

Places
Scalp Level, Pennsylvania
"The Scalp", a geological feature of Barnaslingan, a hill in County Dublin, Ireland

Other uses
SCALP, the acronym for Section carrément anti-Le Pen, a French anti-fascist organisation
SCALP EG, or Storm Shadow, an Anglo-French air-launched cruise missile
Scalp Treatment (1952), a Woody Woodpecker cartoon short
Scalps (1983 film), an American horror film directed by Fred Olen Ray
Scalps (1987 film), a Spaghetti Western

See also
Scalping (disambiguation)